Benito Carbajales Pérez (born in Orense, Spain, 25 July 1913, date of death unknown) was a Cuban footballer, who played as a goalkeeper.

International career
He represented Cuba at the 1938 FIFA World Cup in France. Carbajales appeared in two matches.

References

External links
 

1913 births
Year of death missing
Association football goalkeepers
Cuban footballers
Cuba international footballers
1938 FIFA World Cup players
Spanish emigrants to Cuba